The Azerbaijan Cup is a major association football competition in Azerbaijan. In its original form, it started in 1936, when Azerbaijan was a republic of the Soviet Union and it was not disputed by Azerbaijani teams in the Soviet league pyramid.

Compared to cups in many other countries, Azerbaijan attracts considerably less public interest and even the cup final is rarely sold out. Consequently, the Association of Football Federations of Azerbaijan has experimented with the format in order to raise the profile of the cup.

Format 

The clubs from Azerbaijan First Division (2nd tier) play in the First Round. The winners of that round advance to the Second Round, where the clubs from Azerbaijan Premier League (1st tier) join. For the quarterfinals and the semifinals, the round-robin system is used. For the finals, the format is restored to head-to-head.

Participants
All clubs from the Azerbaijan Premier League and First Division.

History

Soviet time Cup winners

1936: Stroitel Yuga Baku
1937: Temp Baku
1938: Temp Baku
1939: Lokomotiv Baku
1940: Dinamo Baku
1941–46: Not Played
1947: Pischevik Baku
1948: Pischevik Baku
1949: KKF Baku
1950: Trudovye Rezervy Baku
1951: Zavod im. S.M.Budennogo Baku
1952: Zavod im. S.M.Budennogo Baku
1953: Dinamo Baku
1954: BODO Baku
1955: Zavod im. S.M.Budennogo Baku
1956: NPU Ordgonikidzeneft Baku
1957: Mekhsul Tovuz
1958: SK BO PVO Baku
1959: Neftyanik Quba
1960: ATZ Sumgait
1961: NPU Ordgonikidzeneft Baku
1962: MOIK Baku
1963: MOIK Baku
1964: Vostok Baku
1965: Vostok Baku
1966: Vostok Baku
1967: Apsheron Baku
1968: Politechnik Mingechaur
1969: MOIK Baku
1970: MOIK Baku
1971: Suruhanez Salyany
1972: Izolit Mingechaur
1973: MOIK Baku
1974: MOIK Baku
1975: Suruhanez Baku
1976: MOIK Baku
1977: Suruhanez Baku
1978: MOIK Baku
1979: Suruhanez Baku
1980: Energetik Ali-Bayramly
1981: Gandglik Baku
1982: Gandglik Baku
1983: FK Vilash Masalli
1984: Konditer Gandja
1985: Konditer Gandja
1986: İnşaatçı Sabirabad
1987: Khazar Lankaran
1988: Araz Baku
1989: Gandglik Baku
1990: Qarabağ
1991: İnşaatçı Baku

Finals

Note
 The Azerbaijan Cup held in 2001–02 was suspended due to the clashes between clubs and AFFA. The clubs themselves then made an alternative cup. The ultimate winner of the cup was Neftchi. However, the result of an alternative tournament that season is not officially recognized.

Performance

Performance by club

References

External links 
List of Azerbaijan Cup winners (RSSF)

 
Cup
Azerbaijan
Recurring sporting events established in 1936
1936 establishments in the Soviet Union
1992 establishments in Azerbaijan